Shodi Davlyatovich Shabdolov (born 17 October 1943) is a Tajik politician. He was born in Khorugh, Gorno-Badakhshan and was the chairman of the Communist Party of Tajikistan from 1991 until July 2016, when the party replaced him with Ismoil Talbakov.

He has been a member of the Parliament of Tajikistan.

He was married.

References 

Living people
Communist Party of Tajikistan politicians
Members of the Assembly of Representatives (Tajikistan)
People from Gorno-Badakhshan Autonomous Region
1943 births